Grupo Desportivo Serzedelo (abbreviated as GD Serzedelo) is a Portuguese football club based in Serzedelo, Guimarães in the district of Braga.

Background
GD Serzedelo currently plays in the Terceira Divisão Série B which is the fourth tier of Portuguese football. The club was founded in 1967 and they play their home matches at the Campo das Oliveiras in Serzedelo, Guimarães. The stadium is able to accommodate 3,000 spectators.

The club is affiliated to Associação de Futebol de Braga and has competed in the AF Braga Taça. The club has also entered the national cup competition known as Taça de Portugal on occasions.

Season to season

Honours
AF Braga Honra B: 2006–07

Footnotes

External links
Official website 

 
Football clubs in Portugal
Association football clubs established in 1967
1967 establishments in Portugal